1939 Academy Awards may refer to:

 11th Academy Awards, the Academy Awards ceremony that took place in 1939
 12th Academy Awards, the 1940 ceremony honoring the best in film for 1939